Margerum is a surname. Notable people with the surname include: 

Ken Margerum (born 1958), American football player 
Roger Margerum (1931–2016), American architect
Kim Margerum (born 1953), American recording artist/musician
Michael Margerum (born 1951), American architect/musician